Pieter Bos (born 23 February 1997) is a Dutch former professional footballer who played as a goalkeeper.

Career
Bos began playing football with the youth sides of his local club Buitenpost, before moving to Heerenveen's youth academy in 2008. He signed a profesional contract with Cambuur in the Eerste Divisie on 16 June 2016. He made his professional debut with Cambuur in a 2–2 tie with Twente on 3 May 2021, coming on in the 80th minute as the starting goalkeeper Xavier Mous was injured. 

The long-term backup goalkeeper for Cambuur, Bos was forced to retire from professional football at the age of 25 on 18 May 2022, as he was diagnosed with a career-ending heart condition.

Honours
Cambuur
Eerste Divisie: 2020–21

References

External links
 
 
 Eredivisie profile

1997 births
Living people
Footballers from Friesland
Dutch footballers
SC Cambuur players
Eredivisie players
Eerste Divisie players
Association football goalkeepers